Mali Vrh pri Prežganju is a small settlement in the hills east of Ljubljana, the capital of  Slovenia. It belongs to the City Municipality of Ljubljana. The area is part of the traditional region of Lower Carniola and is now included with the rest of the municipality in the Central Slovenia Statistical Region.

Name
The name of the settlement was changed from Mali Vrh to Mali Vrh pri Prežganju in 1955.

References

External links

Mali Vrh pri Prežganju on Geopedia

Populated places in the City Municipality of Ljubljana
Sostro District